Jasper Creek may refer to:

Jasper Creek (California)
Jasper Creek (Venezuela)